Louis-Paul-Armand Simonneaux (19 January 1916 – 22 January 2009) was a French prelate of the Roman Catholic Church and was one of the oldest living bishops and one of oldest French bishops at the time of his death.

Biography
Simonneaux was born in  Servon-sur-Vilaine, France and was ordained a priest on 10 March 1946. He was appointed to the  Diocese of Versailles on 30 September 1967 and ordained bishop on 26 November 1967. He remained bishop of Versailles until 4 June 1988.

References

External links
Diocese site of Versailles 

 
 
 

20th-century Roman Catholic bishops in France
Bishops of Versailles
1916 births
2009 deaths